Big Dipper is a wooden out and back roller coaster at Blackpool Pleasure Beach, Blackpool, England. Originally built in 1923, it was extended in 1936 and was designated as a Grade II listed building on 19 April 2017. It operates with two trains, each containing three four-bench cars, seating two people per bench. After Scenic Railway, Big Dipper is the second-oldest in-use rollercoaster in Britain.
It has restraints of an individual lapbar and a seatbelt.

History

Construction and expansion 
The coaster was first built in 1923 by John Miller. It was extended in 1936 by American engineer Charles Paige (whose work at the Pleasure Beach is all that survives of the 13 wooden coasters he is known to have built) with arches over the south entrance of the park and additional drops. British architect Joseph Emberton designed the ride station.

Refurbishment 
On 13 February 2010, Big Dipper reopened after months of refurbishment following an incident in August 2009. The 1935 station was upgraded in a sympathetic manner: the track was refurbished, a new fountain was added and the trains were repaired and repainted dark blue with new exterior panels with an arrow design similar to the 1990s design. The grab rails were replaced in 2014.

Ride Experience

Layout
Big Dipper is located at South Shore and west of the southern half of Blackpool Pleasure Beach. It is oriented north-to-south, rises to a height of 65 feet and spans 3,300 feet in length. One cycle of the ride takes approximately 2 minutes and 30 seconds.

Characteristics

Manufacturer
Big Dipper was designed by John Miller at Krug Park, Nebraska in 1918 and built by William H. Strickler and Philadelphia Toboggan Coasters, Inc. It cost £25,000 to construct.

Trains
Big Dipper operates two seating trains. Each train has three cars that seat two passengers across four rows, allowing a maximum capacity of 24 people per train.

Track
The  track is 3,300 feet long and the lift is approximately 65 feet high. Big Dipper was the first of its generation to use new undertrack and side friction wheels to allow a steeper and faster design.

Incidents 

On 26 June 1975, part of the main lift hill and first drop were severely damaged by fire.
On 11 August 2009, two trains carrying a total of 32 guests collided. 21 riders required hospital treatment for injuries ranging from whiplash and broken noses to cuts and bruises.
On 5 June 2010, part of a train derailed. There were no injuries and the ride resumed operations a short time later.

Records 
In August 1998, Richard Rodriguez set a world record by riding Big Dipper for over 1,000 hours. There is a plaque commemorating this event in the ride's station. Although he doubled this mark two years later to 2,000 hours, Guinness World Records nullified the achievements by altering the rules in 2007, and Rodriguez's new record was set on Big One and Big Dipper and stands at 405 hours 40 minutes.

In popular culture
Big Dipper is referenced in the Jethro Tull song "Big Dipper", a track from the 1976 album Too Old to Rock 'n' Roll: Too Young to Die!.

Gallery

See also 

Listed buildings in Blackpool

References 

Blackpool Pleasure Beach
Roller coasters in the United Kingdom
Out and back roller coasters
Roller coasters introduced in 1923